Alan Harding (born 14 May 1948) is an English former professional footballer who scored 83 goals from 422 appearances in the Football League playing for Darlington, Lincoln City and Hartlepool United. He played as a striker or on the left wing.

Life and career
Harding was born in Sunderland, which was then in County Durham. He played non-league football for Spennymoor United before joining Darlington in 1969. He scored 37 goals from 129 league appearances over four years for Darlington, then joined Lincoln City in March 1973 for £7,000 plus midfielder Frank McMahon. He spent six years with Lincoln, and was part of the team that won the Fourth Division title in 1975–76. In 1979, he signed for Hartlepool United for £4,000, and spent four years with the club before moving into non-league football in his native north-east of England with Newcastle Blue Star and Ryhope Colliery Welfare.

References

1948 births
Living people
Footballers from Sunderland
English footballers
Association football midfielders
Spennymoor United F.C. players
Darlington F.C. players
Lincoln City F.C. players
Hartlepool United F.C. players
English Football League players
Newcastle Blue Star F.C. players
Ryhope Colliery Welfare F.C. players